Mike Terry may refer to:
 Mike Terry (recording engineer)
 Mike Terry (saxophonist)